Elizabeth Tunnuq (1928 - 16 February 2008) (Inuktitut: ᐃᓕᓴᐱ ᑐᓐᓄᖅ) was an Inuk artist.

Her work is included in the collections of the Art Gallery of Guelph and the government of Nunavut fine art collection.

References

 1928 births
20th-century Canadian women artists
21st-century Canadian women artists
Living people